Jocks Lagoon is an  freshwater coastal lagoon in north-eastern Tasmania, Australia. In 1982 it was designated a wetland of international importance under the Ramsar Convention.

Description
It lies partly on private land and partly at the southern end of the St Helens Point conservation area.

Vegetation
While the northern half of the lagoon is mainly open water, the southern half is mostly covered with emergent rushes and sedges. Threatened plants recorded from the site, or suspected to be present, include jointed twigsedge, slender twigsedge, zigzag bogsedge, yellow onion orchid and erect marshflower.

A total of 51 vascular plant species were recorded from the lagoon by a recent study. Of that total, half were species that grow in swamps or damp areas; vegetation common to dry areas, coastal woodland and Melaleuca forest made up the remainder of the list. The lagoon's aquatic flora is equally rich. Several rare species occur there.

Ramsar criteria
Although Jocks Lagoon is listed as a Ramsar Site, it does not meet all four criteria that determine a site as a Ramsar Site. The lagoon does not meet criterion four, which states that a Ramsar Site is one that "supports species at critical stages or provides refuge in adverse conditions."

See also

 List of Ramsar sites in Australia
 List of lakes in Tasmania

References

Ramsar sites in Australia
Lakes of Tasmania
East Coast Tasmania